Spy Fox 2: "Some Assembly Required" is the second of three games in the Spy Fox series of video games that were developed and published by Humongous Entertainment. The game is an adventure game centered on the World's Fair.

Plot

In the Alps, Spy Fox is first seen with Agent Gracefully, who is part of a spy exchange program (similar to a student exchange program) from Canada. She gives him the assembly instructions for a 1/1000 scale "dogbot" toy and a pill that can transform into a pair of skis by adding water. Suddenly, goons who work at S.M.E.L.L.Y. (the Society for Meaningless Evil Larceny Lying and Yelling) chase Fox, but he gets away after using his skis and jumps onto an airplane.

Spy Fox meets with the Chief of Spy Corps and shows what he has found. The mailing label reads, "To LeRoach. Co: Chateau LeRoach. World's Fair." The Chief then sends Fox there, where Monkey Penny and Professor Quack have already set up the Mobile Command Center. After entering, Spy Fox gives Monkey Penny the assembly instructions for referral, if necessary.  To gain access to the Chateau LeRoach, Fox has to make a false ID card, using Professor Quack's ID maker.  Fox then meets LeRoach, who explains his plan.

LeRoach explains that he disguised the robot as the centerpiece for the World's Fair and that the people going through the turnstile are unknowingly winding gears to get the DogBot operational; this will happen when the 1,000,000th customer enters and the DogBot will go on a horrifying destruction spree. He also says that he hid the Off Switch so it can't be found and that Fox would also need the activation code and get past a "breath detector" device to enter the DogBot. LeRoach then imprisons Fox in the DogBot's mouth. After arranging gears to unlock his prison cell and escape, Fox sets out to help Walter Wireless get to Wee World to receive the Activation Code, enter the DogBot through its achilleas heel (literally) and find the missing Off Switch.

As Fox completes his tasks, LeRoach reveals his backstory, saying that when he was a young boy, he was not allowed to ride the ride "French Pastries of the Past" because he was not tall enough to go through the turnstile. When other kids made fun of him for this, he swore to himself that he would get revenge. Just as Fox sets the activation code and puts the Off Switch in place, the 1,000,000th tourist comes in and LeRoach turns the DogBot on, but Fox is able to shut it back off. When his scheme is foiled, LeRoach escapes to the sewers. If the player follows LeRoach there, a bonus ending will be unlocked. 

In the bonus ending, LeRoach attempts a computer program to set off a million toasters that have been hidden inside the DogBot and burn many pieces of toast, which will result in a dark cloud hanging over the fair for ten months. Spy Fox foils this, however, when he tricks LeRoach into going to Spy Jail through a sewer pipe. Afterwards, the Chief awards Spy Fox and the player with his "eternal gratitude" and an award for catching LeRoach.

Reception

The Electric Playground named Spy Fox 2 the best computer adventure game of 1999.

References

External links
 
 Spy Fox 2: "Some Assembly Required" at Humongous Entertainment

1999 video games
Adventure games
Children's educational video games
Point-and-click adventure games
Single-player video games
Spy Fox
IOS games
Linux games
Windows games
Classic Mac OS games
ScummVM-supported games
GT Interactive games
Android (operating system) games
Video games set in Canada
Video games developed in the United States
Tommo games
Video games about foxes
Video games with alternate endings